Alida Rouffe (1874–1949) was a French actress.

Joséphine Marie Rouffe was born on 20 March 1874 in Bordeaux. Her father was mime artist Louis Rouffe (1849-1885).

She spent most of her career on stage in the south of France, and like her father, she performed in the Alcazar. Later, she acted in many films, including those directed by Marcel Pagnol.

She died on 21 November 1949 in Marseille.

Filmography
Marius (dir. Alexander Korda, 1931).
 (dir. Marc Allégret, 1931).
Toine (dir. René Gaveau, 1932).
Fanny (dir. Marc Allégret, 1932).
Paris Soleil (dir. Jean Hémard, 1932).
Cigalon (dir. Marcel Pagnol, 1935).
Topaze (dir. Marcel Pagnol, 1936).
César (dir. Marcel Pagnol, 1936).
Le Chanteur de minuit (dir. Léo Joannon, 1937).
Le Schpountz (dir. Marcel Pagnol, 1938).
La femme du boulanger (dir. Marcel Pagnol, 1938).
Le Club des fadas (dir. Émile Couzinet, 1939)
Le Paradis des voleurs (dir. Lucien Marsoudet, 1939).
Le Gardian (dir. Jean de Marguenat, 1945).

References

1874 births
1949 deaths
Actresses from Bordeaux
Actresses from Marseille
French film actresses
French stage actresses
20th-century French actresses